The Milang Railway Museum is a museum in the Australian state of South Australia located in the town of Milang in the former Milang railway station.  It was established on 1 November 1999.

It has two collections. One tells the story of the South Australian Railway with focus on the Milang branch. The other is the South Australian Light Railway Centre. It is open at weekends from 2.00 p.m. to 4.00 p.m. and has many interactive displays.

References

External links
Official website

Railway museums in South Australia
1999 establishments in Australia